Straževica is a hill and an urban neighborhood of Belgrade, the capital of Serbia. It is located in Belgrade's municipality of Rakovica. The area was the most heavily bombed  part of Belgrade during the NATO bombing of Serbia in 1999.

Location 

Straževica is located in the central part of the neighborhood, on the  hill of the same name. The neighborhood is small and undeveloped, as the most of the hill is turned into a Belgrade's most important quarry, Kijevo, and on all sides of the hill already developed separate neighborhoods: Kneževac on the north, Jelezovac and Sunčani Breg on the east, Resnik on the south, Kijevo on the southwest and Labudovo Brdo on the west.

Kijevo quarry 

The Straževica slopes are made of rich deposits of sandy-detrital silicified limestone, which are even today exploited in the Kijevo Quarry, which was originally open to supply the railroad company, but also became the main stone source for Belgrade. The entrepreneurs Parapid, Tomić and Marković founded the quarry during the Interbellum.

Military complex 

As underground Yugoslav Army facilities were located there ("Kneževac" underground joint chiefs of staff in war times), the area was heavily bombarded in 1999, almost on daily basis, including some of the largest bombs available at that time (up to 3 tons), which used to shake the entire Belgrade. However, as the underground complex is projected to sustain the force of 20 kilotons, the military facility was intact as it wasn't damaged at all. It is dug underground several hundred meters into the granite terrain with 10 tons-heavy steel doors and includes bio, chemical and radiology filters, working and sleeping premises, depots, etc., plus the radar antenna on the top of the hill. However, some other neighborhoods in the vicinity (most notably Rakovica and Miljakovac) suffered heavy collateral damage from the bombing, while the settlement of Straževica was almost completely destroyed or damaged for the most part, including the Rakovica monastery.

However, the complex is dangerously close to the Kijevo quarry which became operating in 1974. In 1987 the borders of the quarry were set so that it wouldn't endanger the military complex, but the quarry was spreading more and more and in 2006 the army appealed to the government to stop the quarry's growth which resulted in the Ministry of the mining's request to the quarry management to stop the works and restore the area outside of the 1987 borders. However, the new owner of the quarry, Italian company of "Adige Bitumi" continued the works, causing damages to the complex with the underground explosions.

As Straževica was one of the first targets to be bombed in Serbia, one of the most attacked targets in general, and the first bombed location in Belgrade itself, there is a memorial on the hill, named "Herald of Straževica", commemorating the 1999 bombing.

Glasnik monument 

In the summer of 2002, the monument was built on top of the hill, within the military complex. It was named "Glasnik" ("Herald"). The monument has the base in the shape of F 117 aircraft, surrounded by the large slabs of granite. At the bottom of the central part there is a relief, representing images of army officers Vlastimir Lazarević and Vladimir Vujović. They were repairing damaged antenna in 1999, trying to use the period after one wave of bombing, but the next wave ensued quickly killing them both.

The sculpture was made by Slaviša Čeković. It is made of various metal debris, grenade shrapnel, parts of military antennae and pieces of metal constructions. On top of it is the antenna which is disconnected, but still operational, so it could be used eventually. Artistically, the sculpture is described as the "slightly tousled constructivism" with the touch of Vladimir Tatlin, while the style is characterized as Yves Tanguy's play on the unusual contraptions form.

Transportation 

Digging of the tunnel originally began in 1992 (of the beltway itself in 1990), but was halted in 1996 and then resumed in September 2004. As the regulations of the European Union do not allow for highways to go right through the middle of the cities' urban tissue (which is the case with the Pan-European corridor X in Belgrade), Serbian government got 3 years to finish the beltway, but it wasn't finished in time.

Since 2012, the right tube functioned as the two-way tunnel. The deadline for the tube to become operational, so as the complete tunnel, was moved for the early 2022. On the western slopes of the hill, two  elevated bridges were built on the Orlovača-Straževica section of the beltway. They are crossing streams of Topčiderska reka and Kijevski potok, and two railway tracks. The left tube was officially opened for traffic on 15 June 2022. At the time, construction of the elevated circular road was underway. Located a bit further from the eastern entry into the tunnel, the "Straževica" overpass will cross over the newly constructed beltway.

References

External links 
 Image of Straževica

Neighborhoods of Belgrade
Rakovica, Belgrade